Muhammad Ali Mirza, commonly known as Engineer Muhammad Ali Mirza (born 4 October 1977) is a Pakistani Islamic scholar and commentator.

Biography
Muhammad Ali Mirza was born on 4 October 1977 in Jhelum, a city in Punjab, Pakistan. He is a 19th grade mechanical engineer in a government department.

Ali gives online lectures where he talks about different religious issues runs a research academy where he imparts religious education based on his own understanding of Quran and Sunnat. His critics claim that he uses derogatory terms for Islamic Saints and present out of context clips from his lectures as evidence.

Ali allegedly opined that present day Ahmadis are better than Jews and Christians (the people of the book). He, however still declared them as non-Muslims and said that his video clips have been presented out of context. He was arrested on 4 May 2020 in suspicion of spreading hate speech towards religious scholars. Pakistani actor Hamza Ali Abbasi and anchor Shafaat Ali posted on social media condemning his arrest. He was later released on 6 May 2020. According to Ali, one of his lectures was presented completely out of context. He later said that if one starts presenting other opinions in such a way then even the verses of the Qur'an can be presented out of context.

Rivalry with Tariq Masood 
Muhammad Ali Mirza has had a long rivalry with scholar Tariq Masood. The debate between both scholars is particularly about Muawiyah, the First Caliph of the Umayyad Caliphate. Mirza challenged Masood to arrive in Jhelum and have a debate face to face. In May 2021, the debate was postponed since Masood didn't come in After many months, Masood finally accepted the challenge and went to Jhelum for the debate. However, Masood claimed that he had tried to make contacts with Mirza, but there was no answer. Masood claimed that he took a very long journey from Karachi to Jhelum for discussion.

Nupur Sharma case
In June 2022, Mirza Ali criticized Taslim rehmani for badmouthing Hindu Gods in front of BJP spokesperson Nupur Sharma on times Now. He said Nupur Sharma abused Prophet Muhammad in reaction of that. Rubika Liakat praised Engineer Mirza Ali for his stand with Nupur Sharma on her Twitter account. Bjp IT cells on social media also appreciated Mirza for criticizing Taslim rehmani. Many Indian and Pakistani Ulemas were furious on Mirza Ali for justifying Nupur Sharma's blasphemy not checking the fact that Nupur initiated the controversial comments against Prophet Muhammad first and rehmani didn't abuse Hindu Gods.

Assassination attempts
On 14 March 2021, Ali survived a second assassination attempt, first in 2017. The attacker visited his Quran academy in Jhelum, Pakistan at weekly meeting and attempted to kill him with a knife while taking a picture with him. Ali escaped with minor injuries. Police arrested two suspects and registered an FIR against them. The attacker had traveled from Lahore to Jhelum to kill Ali.

See also
Muhammad Ishaq Madni
Abul A'la Maududi
Zubair Ali Zai
Israr Ahmed
Syed Jawad Naqvi
Ilyas Qadri
Tariq Jamil

References

1977 births
Living people
20th-century Muslims
21st-century Muslims
Pakistani Sunni Muslims
Pakistani Muslims
People from Jhelum
Pakistani Muslim scholars of Islam
Pakistani scholars
Pakistani prisoners and detainees
Pakistani YouTubers
Critics of Ahmadiyya